School of Performing Arts Seoul (SOPA;  / ) is an arts high school located in Gung-dong, Guro District, in Seoul, South Korea.

History
SOPA was founded on March 6, 1966 as Jeonghui High School. On February 28, 2002, Park Jae-ryeon was appointed as principal. SOPA was relocated on September 1, 2008 to its current location at 147-1 Gung-dong, Guro-gu in Seoul.

After changing its name to School of Performing Arts Seoul, SOPA took in their first batch of students on March 1, 2009. There are a total of 11,935 graduates as of February 4, 2016, with March 2, 2016 marking new student admissions for the 2016 school year.

Departments
 Department of Theatre & Film
 Department of Practical Dance
 Department of Practical Music
 Department of Stage Arts
 Department of Theatre Arts (combined with Department of Broadcasting Arts to form Department of Theatre & Film)
 Department of Broadcasting Arts (combined with Department of Theatre Arts to form Department of Theatre & Film)

Notable alumni

 

 An Yu-jin
 Bae Suzy
 Bang Ye-dam 
 Cheng Xiao
 Choi Jin-ri (aka "Sulli")
 Choi Jun-hong (aka "Zelo")
 Choi Min-hwan
 Choi Seo-ah (aka "Juniel")
 Choi Ye-won (aka "Arin")
 Choi Yoo-jung
 Choi Yu-na (aka "Yuju")
 Chu So-jung (aka "Exy")
 Gong Chan-sik (aka "Gongchan")
 Heo Young-ji
 Hwang Eun-bi (aka "SinB")
 Hwang Min-hyun
 Jang Do-yoon
 Jang Won-young
 Jang Ye-eun
 Jeon Jung-kook
 Jeong Yun-o (aka "Jaehyun")
 Jo Kwang-min
 Jo Young-min
 Jung Chae-yeon
 Jung Eun-bi (aka "Eunha")
 Jeong Se-woon
 Jung Ye-rin
 Jung Yoon-seok
 Kang Chan-hee
 Kang Mi-na
 Kang Seul-gi
 Kang Yi-seok
 Kim Do-yeon
 Kim Jae-hyun
 Kim Ji-soo
 Kim Jong-in (aka "Kai")
 Kim Min-jae
 Kim Min-ju
 Kim Nam-joo
 Kim Sae-ron
 Kim Woo-jin
 Kim Ye-won (aka "Umji")
 Kwak Dong-yeon
 Kwon Eun-bi
 Lee Da-bin (aka "Yeonwoo")
 Lee Dae-hwi
 Lee Ha-yi
 Lee Hye-ri
 Lee Jae-jin
 Lee Je-no
 Lee Jong-hyun
 Lee Na-eun
 Lee Tae-yong 
 Lee Young-yoo
 Mark Lee
 Na Hae-ryeong
 Na Jae-min
 Oh Ha-young
 Oh Se-hun
 Park Ji-hoon
 Park Jung-hyun (aka "Xiyeon")
 Park Soo-young (aka "Joy")
 Ryu Su-jeong
 Seo Ji-hee
 Shin Ji-hoon
 Son Na-eun
 Son Seung-yeon
 Song Seung-hyun
 Zhou Jieqiong

References

External links
 

Art schools in South Korea
High schools in Seoul
Guro District, Seoul
Educational institutions established in 1966